The Little Marlow Lakes Country Park, is a green space near Marlow and Little Marlow in Buckinghamshire, England, covering approximately 329 ha. Different parts of it are in private and public ownership. The entire site lies within the Green Belt.

Location and access 
The Country Park covers an area between the A4155 to the north and the river Thames to the south and between A404(M) motorway to the west and Coldmoorholme Lane to the east. It is located close to the Chiltern Hills Area of Outstanding Natural Beauty (AONB). Several paths run through the area, with access points in Little Marlow, Coldmoorholme Lane and via the Thames Path. The area around the easternmost lake is known as the Spade Oak Nature Reserve. A large part of the area lies within the 100-year floodplain of the Thames.

History 
In the 19th century, most of the land was dedicated to agricultural use or parkland. During the 1960s and 1970s, the area was used for gravel extraction. These pits were later used as landfill sites, resulting in soil contamination with hazardous waste.

In 2017, the Little Marlow Lakes Country Park was formally designated by Wycombe District Council under the provisions of the Countryside Act 1968. The following items are quoted as fundamental to the vision:
 “to harness the potential that exists in the area, rather than introducing major new development” 
 That “the area will remain predominantly open in character with clustering of activities (and 
any new buildings) being located in areas where development already exists.” 
 The recognition that “there may be special circumstances when some limited, small scale, 
related ‘enabling’ development may be justified” provided they also can “be justified as part 
of a comprehensive approach”.

Nature and wildlife 

There is a large variety of waterfowl in and around the lakes, including kingfisher, grebe and wigeon. The area is also home to skylark, owl, badger, bat, amphibian and reptile species, as well as stag beetle. Wildflowers include teasel and orchid.

Other uses

Residential 
There are residences in the parish of Little Marlow, as well as Westhorpe House and the Westhorpe Park Mobile Home Park. There is a Crowne Plaza hotel in the southwest corner.

Recreation 
Sports facilities and activities in the area include an athletics track, angling for members of the Marlow Angling Club, open water swimming, paddleboarding and water skiing.

Industrial and commercial 
The Little Marlow Sewage Treatment Works lies in the area. There have been several reports over the years of raw sewage spilling into the Thames, the nearby nature reserve or Little Marlow.

In early 2021, part of the area near the Spade Oak lake was used as a temporary film set.

References

External links 
 Little Marlow Lakes website
 Marlow Angling Club

Parks in England
Marlow, Buckinghamshire